José Arístides Manuel Secall Parada (Santiago, June 18, 1949 – July 5, 2021) also known in the artistic world as Pepe Secall, was a Chilean actor and theater director. Until shortly before his death, he was active in film, television, and theater.

He was a member of the Communist Party of Chile and son-in-law of the communist politician Luis Corvalán. Due to that, he was exiled politically during the military dictatorship in the Soviet Union, where he had his daughter in 1979, also an actress, Adela Secall.

Career 
Secall became known professionally with the Teatro Ictus company, a group that he left in 1976 to join another theatrical project: La Feria, together with Jaime Vadell, a company that, installed in a marquee, would be in charge of premiering one of the most controversial works against the military dictatorship, Hojas de Parra.

He entered the telenovelesque genre belatedly – due to his political exile in the Soviet Union – only in the 1990s. He was for many years part of the staff of actors of the television series of the first semester of Canal 13.

His first appearance was in 1984, in the telenovela Andrea, Justicia de mujer, but due to his exile in the Soviet Union, he was banned from television until 1990. With the return of democracy to Chile, he began to participate in telenovelas of Television Nacional de Chile; El milagro de vivir. Later, he was hired by Channel 13 and performed in Marrón Glacé, Champagne, El amor está de moda, Eclipse de luna, Amándote, Fuera de control, Sabor a tí, Piel canela ad Ídolos. In the last one, he shared roles with his daughter in real life, Adela Secall. He also participated in the children's program Pin Pon on TVN between 1991 and 1993 with Jorge Guerra characterizing Amigo Pepe.

In 2009, he returned to Channel 13, with Cuenta conmigo y Feroz. However, he only held four jobs and then left television screens.

In 2014, he returned to television in the TVN series Pulseras rojas, portraying Benito.

In 2016, he returned to Chilean television again with Preciosas, also on Channel 13, in which he has managed to do his most work. In his life he has made 20 television jobs, since 1990. With a total of 10 supporting roles, 4 co-leading roles, one antagonistic, and 4 special participations.

Personal life 
In 1972 he met the dance student, Vivana Corvalán —daughter of the general secretary of the PC, Luis Corvalán—, with whom he formed a relationship until the beginning of 1980. He is the father of the actress Adela Secall Corvalán, who was born in 1979, while he was in his political exile in Moscow, after the military dictatorship of Augusto Pinochet. He has a first-born daughter named María and another named Masha, born in Russia. He is the nephew of actor Roberto Parada, cousin of José Manuel Parada Maluenda and paternal uncle of Javiera Parada. The actor maintained a sentimental bond in his adolescence with the actress Sonia Viveros, with whom he was reunited after his return to Chile and forged a great friendship.

He was a member of the Communist Party of Chile.

Filmography

Film 
 1969: Caliche sangriento, directed by Helvio Soto.
 1989: Contigo a la distancia, directed by José Caviedes.
 1994: Amnesia, directed by Gonzalo Justiniano.
 2004: El aspado, dirigido por Patricio Bustamante.
 2014: Neruda, directed by Manuel Basoalto
 2018: Nadar de noche, directed by Paulo Brunetti.

Telenovelas

TV Series

References 

1949 births
2021 deaths
Chilean television actors
Chilean film actors
People from Santiago
Actors from Santiago
20th-century Chilean actors
21st-century Chilean actors
Chilean actor-politicians